Onești is a city in Bacău County, Romania, with a population of 39,172 inhabitants. It is situated in the historical region of Moldavia.

Administratively, the villages of Slobozia and Borzești form part of Onești.

History

The locality was documentary attested as a village on December 14, 1458. In 1952, the communist authorities decided to build a large petrochemical industrial platform (Borzești Petrochemical Plant) and a new related city in the area of Onești and Borzești villages. Borzești, according to legend, was the birthplace of Stephen III of Moldavia. It is the site of the Borzești Church, which was built on his orders in 1493–1494.

At the death of the Communist leader Gheorghe Gheorghiu-Dej in March 1965, Onești was renamed Gheorghe Gheorghiu-Dej, but the name was changed back in 1990.

Above the borough Malu, on the right-hand side of the river Cașin, were discovered archaeological fragments from a settlement dating from the Neolithic.

Geography
The city is crossed by the European road E574 and by the national roads DN11A and DN12A that connect it to Bucharest, to the northern part of the country, and to Transylvania. Rail connections are made through the Căile Ferate Române network, and the proposed A13 Brașov–Bacău Motorway will link the city to the rest of Romania's highway network as a second connection to the country's major cities.

Demographics

Economy
Borzești is a neighborhood in the southeast of Onești, under separate administration until 1968. The Borzești Petrochemical Plant is located there.

Culture
Saint Nicholas is the patron saint of the city, whose inhabitants are predominantly Romanian Orthodox. St. Nicholas Day, 6 December, is the municipal day of Onești.

Popular tourist attractions are Perchiu Hill and the Hero Cross from atop the aforementioned hill, the Municipal History Museum, a steel monument dedicated to the Romanian national poet Mihai Eminescu, and the city park.

Natives
 Diana Chelaru, gymnast
 Nadia Comăneci, gymnast
 Daniel Dines, entrepreneur
 Teodora Enache, jazz singer
 Georgeta Gabor, gymnast
 Loredana Groza, singer
 Ana Maria Pavăl, wrestler

Twin towns and sister cities
 Strășeni, Moldova (2015)
 Skien,  Norway
 Eysines, France

See also
CSM Borzești
FCM Dinamo Onești

Notes

External links

1458 establishments
Populated places established in the 1450s
Populated places in Bacău County
Cities in Romania
Monotowns in Romania
Localities in Western Moldavia